The finals and the qualifying heats of the Women's 100 metres Butterfly event at the 1997 FINA Short Course World Championships were held on the third day of the competition, on Saturday 19 April 1997 in Gothenburg, Sweden.

Finals

See also
1996 Women's Olympic Games 100m Butterfly
1997 Women's European LC Championships 100m Butterfly

References
 Results

B
1997 in women's swimming